Renier González (born 1972) is a Cuban-American chess grandmaster.

Chess career
González grew up in Cuba and began playing chess in the second grade, later playing for the national team. He defected from Cuba to the United States in 1999 and began living in Florida, where he taught chess at Nova Southeastern University and Pine Crest School.

In March 2004, he transferred chess federations from Cuba to the United States. Prior to this, he was the top ranked chess player in Cuba. In 2004, he achieved norms at the Mashantucket Open and at the Lindsborg Open. In 2007, he achieved his final norm at the Banyoles International Open, where he finished first and tied with José González García, Mihail Marin and Lewan Aroszidze. Afterwards, he joined Miami Dade College's chess team as the captain. In 2008, he was awarded the Grandmaster title.

In May 2018, he provided training for the Bahamas Chess Federation's members for the 43rd World Chess Olympiad.

He served as the captain of the Bahamas Chess Federation's open section team for the 44th Chess Olympiad in 2022.

In October 2022, he won the Michigan Chess Association men's championships.

Personal life
González resides in Jonesville, Michigan.

References

Living people
1972 births
American chess players
Chess grandmasters
Sportspeople from Matanzas
Cuban emigrants to the United States
21st-century Cuban people